Mohamed Pappu Hossain (born 7 April 1999), is a Bangladeshi professional footballer who plays as a goalkeeper for Chittagong Abahani in Bangladesh Premier League. 

He is the nephew of Bangladesh national team player Sohel Rana.

International career
In October 2019, Pappu gets his first-ever senior national team call up for a FIFA friendly against Bhutan.

In November 2019, Pappu gets a U-23 call up for 2019 South Asian Games.

Club career
Pappu Hossain started his senior career with Arambagh KS. He joined Saif Sporting Club in 2017, where he won the award for best goalkeeper in the Bangladesh Premier League from the Bangladesh Football Supporters Forum. He was also part of Saif's 2018 AFC Cup qualification squad. During 2019 he was loaned to Dhaka Mohammedan.

References

Saif SC players
1999 births
Living people
Bangladeshi footballers
Association football goalkeepers